Coconut production plays an important role in the national economy of India.

Traditional areas of coconut cultivation are the Malabar and Coromandel coasts. The states of Kerala, Karnataka, and Tamil Nadu practise large-scale intensive farming of coconut. Andhra Pradesh, Maharashtra, Orissa, West Bengal, Gujarat,  Assam, Pondicherry, and Goa; and the island territories of Lakshadweep, and Andaman and Nicobar are other areas of coconut production.

References

See also
Coconut production in Kerala
Coconut Development Board

India
Agricultural production in India by commodity